The Microregion of Assis is located on the west of São Paulo state, Brazil, and is made up of 17 municipalities and it belongs to the Mesoregion of Assis.

The population of the Microregion is 278.220 inhabitants, in an area of 7.141,738 km²

Municipalities 
The microregion consists of the following municipalities, listed below with their 2014 Census populations (IBGE/2014):

 Assis 100.911
 Paraguaçu Paulista 44.555
 Cândido Mota 31.063
 Palmital 22.041
 Tarumã 14.027
 Maracaí 13.878
 Quatá 13.603
 Iepê 8.002
 Ibirarema 7.290
 Campos Novos Paulista 4.808
 Platina 3.406
 Pedrinhas Paulista 3.062
 Nantes 2.943
 Florínea 2.821
 Lutécia 2.741
 Cruzália 2.234
 Borá 835

References

Assis